Ali Cavad oghlu Ahmadov (27 January 1953) is an Azerbaijani professor, Deputy Prime Minister of the Republic of Azerbaijan, Deputy Chairman of the New Azerbaijan Party, and Executive Secretary of the New Azerbaijan Party.

Biography
Ali Ahmadov was born on January 27, 1953, in Dara, Armenia SSR. He graduated from the Faculty of History of Moscow State Historical-Archival Institute. From 1975 he was a senior researcher at Main Archives Department, head of Central Scientific General Archive of Azerbaijan National Academy of Sciences. Since 1980 he has worked as a laboratory assistant, teacher, senior teacher, associate professor, head of the department at Azerbaijan State University.

He is the author of 1 textbook, more than 50 scientific works and articles.

Political career
From 1997 Ali Ahmadov worked as a Deputy Head of Department in Presidential Administration of Azerbaijan. In 1999–2000, he was the Head of Khatai Raion Executive. In 1999, at the first congress of the New Azerbaijan Party, he was elected Executive Secretary of the party. He was elected Deputy Chairman and Executive Secretary of the New Azerbaijan Party at the III Congress of the Party in 2005, the V Congress in 2013 and the VI Congress in 2018. In 2000, he was a deputy of 2nd convocation of Milli Majlis.

On November 6, 2005, he was elected a deputy from Narimanov First Constituency. He was a member of Standing Committee on Science and Education of Milli Majlis. In 2010, A. Ahmadov was elected a deputy of 4th convocation of Milli Majlis. Head of Azerbaijan-China working group on interparliamentary relations, member of Azerbaijan-Belarus, Azerbaijan-Italy working groups on interparliamentary relations.

Since October 22, 2013, he has been the Deputy Prime Minister of the Republic of Azerbaijan.

Awards
 Knight's Cross of the Order of Merit of the Republic of Poland — 2009
 Shohrat Order — 21 January 2013

References

New Azerbaijan Party politicians
Azerbaijani professors
1953 births
Living people
People from Gegharkunik Province